Pierre Kipré (born 23 February 1945 in Daloa) is a historian and writer from Ivory Coast. He is a former student of the École normale supérieure in Abidjan.

Pierre Kipré was ambassador of Ivory Coast in France with residence in Paris until 2010. During the 2010–11 Ivorian crisis, he sided with president Laurent Gbagbo.

In 1987, his book Villes de Côte d’Ivoire (1893–1940) earned him the Noma Award for Publishing in Africa.

Publications

Personal works 
1975: Le président Félix Houphouët-Boigny et la nation ivoirienne, collection of annotated text, preceded by a presentation, Abidjan, N.E.A., 333 p.
1985: Daloa, une cité dans l’histoire, Abidjan, SIIS, 54 p.
1985: Villes de Côte d'Ivoire (1893-1940). Tome 1, La fondation des villes, Abidjan, N.E.A., 275 p.
1986: Villes de Côte d'Ivoire (1893-1940). Tome 2, Économie et société urbaine, Abidjan, N.E.A., 290 p.
1987: Les relations internationales : de la Première Guerre mondiale à la crise cubaine de 1962, Abidjan, Publications de l'ENS d'Abidjan, series "Les cours de CAPES"
1988: La Côte d'Ivoire coloniale (1890-1940), tome 2, Abidjan, AMI/Bordas, series "Mémorial de la Côte d'Ivoire", 303 p.
1989: Le congrès de Bamako ou La naissance du RDA, Paris, Éditions Chaka, 190 p.
1991: Histoire de Côte d'Ivoire, Abidjan, Paris, AMI/EDICEF, series "Manuels du premier cycle", 195 p.
2000: Démocratie et société en Côte d'Ivoire : essai politique, Abidjan, Éd. AMI, 105 p., 2000
2005: (with S. Brunel and M-A. Pérouse de Montclos), L'aide au Tiers monde à quoi bon ?, Paris, les Éditions de l'Atelier, 115 p.
2005: Côte d'Ivoire : la formation d'un peuple, Paris, Éd. SIDES-IMA, 292 p.
2006: Intégration régionale et développement rural en Afrique de l’Ouest, Paris, Édition SIDES – IMA, 144 p.
2009: Inventaire critique des manuels d’histoire en Afrique francophone, Paris, Éditions de l’UNESCO, 78 p.
2010: Les migrations en Afrique de l’Ouest et la fabrication de l’étranger, Abidjan, Éditions du CERAP, 160 p.
2014: Cultures et identités nationales en Afrique de l'Ouest : le Daa dans la societe beninoise d'hier a demain, L'Harmattan, 220 p.

Direction of collective works 
1992: (codir. with L. Harding), Commerce et commerçants en Afrique : la Côte d'Ivoire, Paris, L'Harmattan, 295 p.
2001: (codir. with Aké G-M. Ngbo), Conflits régionaux et indépendances nationales en Afrique de l’Ouest, Paris, L'Harmattan, 128 p.
2011: (codir. with Aké G-M. Ngbo), Les conditions économiques de l'indépendance à l'ère de la mondialisation : mythes et réalités en Afrique de l’Ouest, L'Harmattan

Collective works 
Pierre Kitré contributed to some forty collective works, including:
 L’Afrique depuis 1935, Paris and Abidjan, Éditions UNESCO et N.E.I., p. 403-438
 Les populations africaines de la Côte atlantique, du Bandama à la Volta (XIIe- XVIe siècles in D. T. Niane (éd.), "Histoire générale de l’Afrique", UNESCO/N.E.A, 1985, vol. 4, chap. 13, p. 355-370
 Dictionnaire Borremans – La Côte d’Ivoire et ses cultures (articles d’histoire et de géographie des tomes 1 et 2), Abidjan, N.E.A., 1986
 Sociétés urbaines et pratiques de l'espace : le cas ivoirien de 1930 à 1960, in C. Coquery-Vidrovitch. (éd.), "Processus d'urbanisation en Afrique", L'Harmattan, 1988, p. 37-45
 L'interface Sahara-Sahel dans la géopolitique en Afrique noire (XIIe-XXe siècles), in Le Sahel, Ministère de la Coopération, Paris, 1989
 (with A. Tirefort) La Côte d’Ivoire, in C. Coquery-Vidrovitch (éd.), "L'Afrique Occidentale au temps des Français", Paris, La Découverte, 1992
 Le développement industriel et la croissance urbaine in A. Mazrui & Chr. Wondji (éd.), "Histoire générale de l’Afrique. Tome VIII", 1998
 L'Afrique et ses avenirs, in Y. Michaud (éd.), "Qu'est-ce que la culture ?", Paris, 2001, p. 91-104
 Les discours politiques de décembre 1999 à l'élection présidentielle d'octobre 2000 : thèmes,  enjeux et confrontations, in C. Vidal and M. LePape (éd.), "Côte d'Ivoire : l'année terrible", Paris, Karthala, 2002, p. 81-122
 Les méthodes et problèmes de l'histoire africaine (chapter 1) and Les mutations contemporaines en Afrique (chapter 8), in Paul Vandepitte et Maria Turano (éd.), "Pour une histoire de l'Afrique : douze parcours", Lecce/Italia, Édition ARGO, 2003
 Postface by Anne-Cécile Robert, L'Afrique au secours de l'Occident, Paris, Éditions Le Monde et Éditions de l(Atelier, 2005, p. 203-205
 De l'immigration à l'intégration : le cas des villages burkinabé de la région de la Marahoué, in Chantal Chanson-Jabeur ad Odile Goerg (éd.), "Mama Africa : hommage à Catherine Coquery-Vidrovitch", Paris, L'Harmattan, 2005, p. 169-182
 Les frontières et la question nationale en Afrique de l'Ouest, in UNESCO/CISH, '"Des frontières en Afrique du XII au XX", Paris, Éditions de l'UNESCO, 2005, p. 91-115
 L'intégration régionale et les tâches des intellectuels ouest-africains, in Souleymane Yéo (ed.), "Les États nations face à l'intégration régionale en Afrique de l'Ouest : le cas de la Côte d'Ivoire", Paris, Karthala, 2009, p. 25-42
 De la Côte d'Ivoire coloniale, in "L'Afrique en noir et blanc : Louis-Gustave Binger, explorateur", Paris, Somogy éditions d'art, 2009, p. 185-197

External links 
 List of publications on CAIRN
  Kipré, Pierre. - Villes de Côte d'Ivoire 1893-1940. I. Fondation des villes coloniales en Côte d'Ivoire. II. Économie et société urbaine (compte rendu) on Persée 
 Pierre Aimé Rémy KIPRÉ on Abidjan.net
 Interview with Pierre Kipré

Ivorian writers
20th-century historians
Ambassadors of Ivory Coast to France
1945 births
Living people
Ivorian male writers
20th-century male writers
People from Daloa